Ellerbeckia is a genus of diatoms belonging to the family Paraliaceae.

The species of this genus are found in Europe and Northern America.

Species:
 Ellerbeckia penzhica Lupikina, 1991

References

Diatoms
Diatom genera